The Senior CLASS Award is presented each year to the outstanding senior NCAA Division I Student-Athlete of the Year in softball.  The award was established in 2007 and went to Caitlin Lowe of the Arizona Wildcats.

See also

 List of sports awards honoring women
 NCAA Division I softball tournament

References

External links 
 Official site

College softball in the United States lists
College sports trophies and awards in the United States
Senior
Student athlete awards in the United States